Zhang Fusheng (born 20 September 1993) is a Chinese sports shooter. He competed in the men's 25 metre rapid fire pistol event at the 2016 Summer Olympics.

References

External links
 

1993 births
Living people
Chinese male sport shooters
Olympic shooters of China
Shooters at the 2016 Summer Olympics
Place of birth missing (living people)